Kenton is a town in Cimarron County, Oklahoma, United States. Kenton is the westernmost town in Oklahoma.

The settlement had 31 residents at the 2020 census.  Kenton, which lies in the Cimarron River valley, is just south of Black Mesa, the highest point in Oklahoma, and serves as an unofficial staging point for visitors to the site.  The east end of the mesa features dinosaur tracks which have been preserved in a sandstone strata next to Carrizo Creek. Black Mesa State Park, which contains Lake Carl Etling, is to the southeast. The Preston Monument, at the tripoint of Colorado, New Mexico and Oklahoma, is about 10 driving miles north-northwest.  Kenton is the closest settlement to Carrizo Canyon, about 22 miles north inside Colorado, which is a small gorge in the Comanche National Grassland graced by juniper and cottonwood trees in which American Indian petroglyphs can be found along the walls.

History
The town originated with Carizzo, later called Florence, just over the line in New Mexico.  It was, along with a place called Mineral, one of only two significant settlements in the area of the pre-statehood Oklahoma Panhandle.  When a nephew of P.T. Barnum by the name of Fairchild B. Drew became postmaster of the place, he moved the post office a bit to the east and changed the name to Kenton in 1893. At the time Oklahoma became a state (on November 16, 1907), it served as the temporary county seat for Cimarron County. The building now known as "The Merc" served as the temporary courthouse and held the county records. The citizens of the county voted to move the seat on June 11, 1908 to Boise City soon after statehood. Kentonites did not want to give up the records, so a group of people from Boise City confiscated the documents before the end of a 30-day waiting period. This started a local legend that Boise City stole the courthouse.

During its heyday, Kenton had two car dealerships, a motel, a bank, and two general stores.

Despite threats of closure over the years, the post office in Kenton remains open.

Time zone 
Kenton is the only Oklahoma community that observes Mountain Time, reportedly because most of the people who interact with the town are from New Mexico or Colorado.  This is despite the fact that officially, the time zone only changes west of the Oklahoma/New Mexico state line.  To avoid confusion, "Mountain Time" is often added when giving the time to visitors. Posted business hours all end with "MT" or "MST" to specify Mountain Time.

Geography
It is located on the south side of the Cimarron River in the Cimarron River valley.

State Highway 325 serves the community.

Kenton experiences a semi-arid climate (Köppen BSk) with cool, dry winters and very hot, wetter summers.

Demographics
As of the 2010 United States Census, there were 17 people, 9 households, and 6 families residing in the CDP. The racial makeup of the city was 100.0% White. Hispanic or Latino of any race were 11.8% of the population.

There were 9 households, out of which 11.1% had children under the age of 18 living with them, 66.7% were married couples living together, and 33.3% were non-families. 33.3% of all households were made up of individuals, and 11.1% had someone living alone who was 65 years of age or older. The average household size was 1.89 and the average family size was 2.33.

In the CDP the population was spread out, with 11.8% under the age of 18, 0.0% from 18 to 24, 17.6% from 25 to 44, 29.4% from 45 to 64, and 41.2% who were 65 years of age or older. The median age was 58.8 years. For every 100 females there were 88.9 males. For every 100 females age 18 and over, there were 87.5 males.

According to the 2013 American Community Survey, the median income for a household in the CDP was $18,750, and the median income for a family could not be computed because there were not enough sample observations. Median income for males and females could not be computed because there were not enough sample observations. The per capita income for the CDP was $8,320. About 41.7% of families and 68.3% of the population were below the poverty line, including 100.0% of those under age 18. The percentage of those age 65 or over living in poverty could not be computed because there were not enough sample observations.

Notable person
 Foy Vance, a popular Northern Irish singer-songwriter, spent his early childhood living in Kenton during the late 1970s. His father, Hugh Bailie Vance, was a traveling preacher in the evangelical Churches of Christ.

Museum
The town is home to the Kenton Museum, which is housed in a 1902 native rock former residence. The varied collection includes artifacts that helped settle No Man's Land, and other period photos and antiques.

References

External links
Kenton information, photos and videos on TravelOK.com Official travel and tourism website for the State of Oklahoma
Bat Cave Archaeological Site
Red Ghost Cave Archaeological district
Three Entrance Cave Archaeological district
This Land "The Last of Kenton"
Kenton Collection at Oklahoma State University
Hoot Owl Guest Ranch
Hitching Post Lodging & Ranch
Black Mesa Bed & Breakfast

Census-designated places in Cimarron County, Oklahoma
Archaeological sites in Oklahoma
Oklahoma Panhandle
Populated places established in 1893
1893 establishments in Oklahoma Territory